Asperula lilaciflora is a species of flowering plant in the family Rubiaceae.

Description 
Asperula lilaciflora was described in 1843

References 

lilaciflora
Taxa named by Pierre Edmond Boissier